pH is a measure of acidity or alkalinity.

PH, ph, pH, and Ph may also refer to:
 Philippines (ISO country code PH), a country located in Southeast Asia

Arts and media
 PistonHeads, a motoring website and forum
 PH (band), formerly known as Mr. Peter Hayden, a Finnish band
 Pornhub, a pornographic video sharing website
 Production house

Aviation
 Prefix for the Netherlands; see List of aircraft registration prefixes
 IATA airline designator for Polynesian Airlines; see List of airline codes (P)
 Transavia Denmark (IATA: PH)

Companies and organizations
 Parker-Hannifin Corporation (stock ticker PH)
 Pakatan Harapan (also known as "Alliance of Hope"), a political coalition in Malaysia

Places
 Port Harcourt, (alternative name of the city)
 Preston Hollow, Dallas, a neighborhood
 PH postcode area, postcode area in Scotland

Science and technology

Chemistry
 Phenyl group, either -Ph or Φ, highly-stable and aromatic hydrocarbon unit found in many organic compounds
 Pleckstrin homology domain, a part of many proteins which bind phosphoinositides with high affinity

Computing
 .ph, the Philippines' Internet country code top-level domain
 Ph protocol, an early web database search for CCSO Nameserver described by RFC 2378
 PH (complexity), the union of all complexity classes in the polynomial hierarchy in computational complexity theory

Physics
 Phot, or ph, a measurement of illuminance, in photometry
 Picohenry, an SI Unit of electrical inductance

Other sciences
 Planet Hunters, a group that hunts for exoplanets
 Precipitation hardening, a heat treatment technique used to increase the yield strength of malleable materials
 Pulmonary hypertension, a medical condition

Other uses
 pʰ, a phoneme
 Ph (digraph), a common digraph that represents the phoneme /f/ (voiceless labiodental fricative) in phonetics
 PH, abbreviation for professional hunter used in East and Southern Africa
 (ph), a notation used in transcripts to indicate that the transcriber does not know the spelling, usually of a name, and has spelled it as it was pronounced (phonetically)
 Poul Henningsen (1894–1967), a Danish writer and designer referred to as PH in Denmark
 Professional hunter
 Public house, most commonly referred to as pub, an establishment licensed to serve alcoholic drinks
 Purple Heart, a US military award, in post-nominal designation
 Pinch hitter, in baseball
 abbreviation used to denote the English regnal years of Philip II of Spain
 Pḥ, abbreviation (e.g. on maps) for parish, also in the meaning of civil parish
 Phillips, a type of cross-head screw drive bits

See also
 Phi (φ), a letter of the Greek alphabet